Felix Darfour or Darfur (c.1740–1822) was a Haitian journalist who founded the newspaper L'eclaireur Haytien. In 1822 he was preparing a petition to the Chamber of Commons, but was arrested, court-martialed and shot before the petition was heard.

Felix was born in Darfur, Sudan and was educated in Paris, France.

References

18th-century births
1822 deaths
Haitian journalists
People from Darfur